Roper Racing is an American professional stock car racing team that competes in the NASCAR Craftsman Truck Series, fielding the No. 04 Ford F-150 part-time for Kaden Honeycutt.

History

Truck Series

Truck No. 04 history

The team debuted in the spring Martinsville race in 2018 with team owner Cory Roper driving. Roper started 17th and finished 13th. Roper would then run more races, specifically at Iowa, Bristol, the second Las Vegas and Texas races, and the season finale at Homestead throughout the year, scoring a best finish of 13th at Martinsville Speedway. In 2019, Roper attempted 11 races, scoring a best finish of 9th at Texas Motor Speedway and 3 other top 20 finishes. However, he also failed to qualify at Bristol Motor Speedway and Las Vegas Motor Speedway. Roper attempted the first 12 races before not attempting another race that season. He got 3 top-20 finishes, including a 14th-place finish in the NextEra Energy 250.  

In 2021, Roper was leading in the NextEra Energy 250 on the last lap but was passed by race winner Ben Rhodes and Jordan Anderson, finishing third. NASCAR Cup Series driver Chase Briscoe went on to drive three races, which included the team's second top-five finish at Bristol Motor Speedway.  

The team did not attempt to qualify at any races during the 2022 season. 

On January 31, 2023, the team announced that Kaden Honeycutt would be driving the entry during the first six races of the season. On February 22, Roper was indefinitely suspended by NASCAR for violating the substance abuse policy.

Truck No. 04 Results

 Season still in progress
 Ineligible for series points

References

External links
 

NASCAR teams